The Russian Third League 1995 was the 2nd time competition on the fourth level of Russian football was professional. It was the first season when 3 points were awarded for a win. There were 6 zones with 98 teams starting the competition (5 were excluded before the end of the season).

Zone 1

Overview

Standings

Notes:

 FC Spartak-d Vladikavkaz were excluded from the league after playing 21 games and gaining 19 points. Their opponents were awarded a win in the remaining games. They played their first professional season. Spartak-d did not play in any national-level competitions in 1996.
 FC Spartak Alagir were excluded from the league after playing 17 games and gaining 16 points. Their opponents were awarded a win in the remaining games. Spartak did not play in any national-level competitions in 1996.
 FC Zhemchuzhina-d Sochi was excluded from the league after playing 13 games and gaining 18 points. All their results were discarded. They played their first professional season.
 FC Kolos-d Krasnodar was excluded from the league after playing 11 games and gaining 13 points. All their results were discarded. They were renamed from FC Kolos-2 Krasnodar. Kolos-d did not play in any national-level competitions in 1996.
 FC Anzhi-2 Makhachkala was not promoted as reserve teams were not eligible for promotion.
 FC Ingushetiya Nazran moved to Malgobek and was renamed to FC Angusht.
 FC Argo Kaspiysk moved to Makhachkala and was renamed to FC Anzhi-2.
 FC Spartak-2 Nartkala and FC Druzhba-d Maykop played their first professional season.
 FC Derbent did not play professionally in 1994.

Top goalscorers 
21 goals

 Isa Markhiyev (FC Angusht Malgobek)

20 goals

 Alisher Gippot (FC Olimp Kislovodsk)

18 goals

 Budun Budunov (FC Anzhi-2 Makhachkala)

15 goals

 Yuri Takliyev (FC Iriston Mozdok)

14 goals

 Oleg Kamyshov (FC Olimp Kislovodsk)
 Kyamran Nurakhmedov (FC Dynamo Makhachkala)

13 goals

 Ruslan Musayev (FC Angusht Malgobek)

12 goals

 Yaroslav Kazberov (FC Angusht Malgobek)
  Narvik Sirkhayev (FC Dynamo Makhachkala)

11 goals

 Andranik Babayan (FC Lokomotiv Mineralnye Vody)

Zone 2

Overview

Standings

Notes:

 FC Kuban Slavyansk-na-Kubani awarded 1 home win.
 FC Spartak-Bratskiy Yuzhny awarded 1 home loss.
 FC Lokomotiv Liski, FC APK Morozovsk and FC Ritm Alekseyevka promoted from the Amateur Football League.
 FC Atommash Volgodonsk renamed to FC Volgodonsk.
 FC Luch Tula and FC Dynamo Mykhaylovka played their first professional season.
 FC Lokomotiv Yelets promoted from the Amateur Football League, where they played in 1994 as FC Torpedo Yelets.
 FC Ritm Alekseyevka did not play in any national-level competitions in 1996.

Top goalscorers 

21 goals

 Vagif Shirinov (FC Kuban Slavyansk-na-Kubani)

20 goals

 Vladimir Kharin (FC Lokomotiv Liski)

18 goals

 German Telesh (FC Luch Tula)

15 goals

 Aleksandr Glazkov (FC Oryol)

14 goals

 Konstantin Boyko (FC Istochnik Rostov-on-Don)
 Aleksandr Korneyev (FC Dynamo Mikhaylovka)

12 goals

 Vladimir Grishchenko (FC Niva Slavyansk-na-Kubani)
 Nikolai Kolchugin (FC Rotor-d Volgograd)

11 goals

 Valentin Shashkov (FC Shakhtyor Shakhty)
 Yuri Sirota (FC Volgodonsk)

Zone 3

Overview

Standings

Notes:

 FC Asmaral-d Moscow was excluded from the league after playing 23 games and gaining 4 points. Their opponents were awarded a win in the remaining games. Asmaral-d did not play in any national-level competitions in 1996.
 PFC CSKA-d Moscow and FC Torpedo-d Moscow awarded 1 home loss each.
 FC Spartak-d Moscow was not promoted as reserves teams were not eligible for promotion.
 FC Tekhinvest-M Moskovskiy moved to Selyatino and renamed to FC Moskovskiy-Selyatino.
 FC Torpedo-MKB Mytishchi renamed to FC Torpedo. Torpedo did not play in any national-level competitions in 1996.
 FC Fabus Bronnitsy played their first professional season.
 FC Rossiya Moscow renamed to FC Monolit.
 FC Krasnogvardeyets Moscow promoted from the Amateur Football League.
 FC Smena Moscow promoted from the Amateur Football League, where they played in 1994 as FC Smena-Ronika Moscow.

Top goalscorers 

35 goals

 Aleksei Kutsenko (FC Dynamo-d Moscow)

32 goals

 Aleksei Snigiryov (FC Moskovskiy-Selyatino Selyatino)

27 goals

 Aleksandr Shirko (FC Spartak-d Moscow)

21 goals

 Yuri Moiseyev (FC Don Novomoskovsk)

20 goals

  Andrey Movsisyan (FC Spartak-d Moscow)

19 goals

 Dmitri Chesnokov (FC Titan Reutov)

18 goals

 Anatoli Sigachyov (FC Don Novomoskovsk)

17 goals

 Andrei Afanasyev (FC Mosenergo Moscow)
 Konstantin Golovskoy (FC Spartak-d Moscow)
 Aleksei Kryuchkov (FC Titan Reutov)
 Andrei Meshchaninov (FC Kosmos Dolgoprudny)

Zone 4

Overview

Standings

Notes:

 FC Prometey-Dynamo St. Petersburg renamed to FC Dynamo.
 FC Vympel Rybinsk did not play in any national-level competitions in 1996.

Top goalscorers 

11 goals

 Kamil Ferkhanov (FC Turbostroitel Kaluga)

9 goals

 Sergei Grabazdin (FC Volochanin Vyshny Volochyok)
 Aleksandr Gusev (FC Metallurg Pikalyovo)
 Vadim Kovalyov (FC Kristall Dyatkovo)

8 goals

 Valeri Alistarov (FC Turbostroitel Kaluga)
 Aleksei Volkhonskiy (FC Spartak Kostroma)

7 goals

 Nikolai Churakov (FC Dynamo St. Petersburg)
 Sergei Subratov (FC Dynamo Bryansk)
 Mikhail Zinikov (FC Dynamo St. Petersburg)

6 goals

 Igor Aksyonov (FC Neftyanik Yaroslavl)
 Aleksei Chikin (FC Spartak Kostroma)
 Aleksandr Gultyayev (FC Mashinostroitel Pskov)
 Sergei Kubryakov (FC Mashinostroitel Pskov)
 Valeri Lenivkov (FC Vympel Rybinsk)

Zone 5

Overview

Standings

Notes:

 FC Lada-d Togliatti was excluded from the league after playing 25 games. Opponents were awarded wins in the remaining games. That was their first professional season and they did not play in any national-level competitions in 1996.
 FC Zavodchanin Saratov played their first professional season.
 FC Planeta Bugulma promoted from the Amateur Football League.
 FC Tekstilshchik Isheyevka moved to Ulyanovsk and renamed FC Volga.

Top goalscorers 

25 goals

 Vadim Tyurin (FC Zavodchanin Saratov)

20 goals

 Vladimir Anisimov (FC Khimik Dzerzhinsk)

14 goals

 Vladimir Mishin (FC Volga Ulyanovsk)

11 goals

 Viktor Zorkin (FC Khimik Dzerzhinsk)

10 goals

 Sergei Glazunov (FC Salyut Saratov)

9 goals

  Ruslan Adzhiyev (FC Lada-d Togliatti)
 Eduard Bazarov (FC Volga Balakovo)
 Anatoli Lychagov (FC Kristall Sergach)
 Sergei Panov (FC Druzhba Yoshkar-Ola)
 Yuri Telyushov (FC Zenit Penza)
 Aleksei Tilman (FC Astrateks Astrakhan)
 Aleksei Tokarev (FC Zavodchanin Saratov)
 Oleg Zykov (FC Zavodchanin Saratov)

Zone 6

Overview

Standings

Notes:

 FC Sodovik Sterlitamak awarded 1 home win.
 FC Dynamo Perm and FC KamAZ-Chally-d Naberezhnye Chelny awarded 1 home loss.
 FC Amkar Perm and FC Dynamo-Gazovik-d Tyumen played their first professional season.
 FC Gornyak Kachkanar renamed to FC Gornyak-Vanadiy.
 FC Gornyak Kushva promoted from the Amateur Football League.
 FC Estel Ufa renamed to FC Agidel. Agidel did not play in any national-level competitions in 1996.
 FC KAMAZ-d Naberezhnye Chelny renamed to FC KAMAZ-Chally-d Naberezhnye Chelny.

Top goalscorers 

12 goals

 Aleksandr Feofanov (FC Sodovik Sterlitamak)
 Vladimir Titov (FC Trubnik Kamensk-Uralsky)

11 goals

 Aleksei Kolotov (FC Elektron Vyatskiye Polyany)

10 goals

 Vyacheslav Ivanov (FC Agidel Ufa)
 Denis Malyavkin (FC Metiznik Magnitogorsk)
 Andrei Shabanov (FC Uralmash-d Yekaterinburg)
 Arslon Talipov (FC Amkar Perm)

9 goals

 Aleksandr Chernykh (FC Gornyak-Vanadiy Kachkanar)

8 goals

 Sergei Chebanov (FC Amkar Perm)
 Sergei Cherkasov (FC Metiznik Magnitogorsk)
 Nazar Polishchuk (FC Energiya Chaikovsky)
 Igor Shmidt (FC Gornyak-Vanadiy Kachkanar)
 Sergei Sidorov (FC Sodovik Sterlitamak)
 Robert Zinnyatulov (FC Sodovik Sterlitamak)
 Konstantin Zyryanov (FC Amkar Perm)

See also
1995 Russian Top League
1995 Russian First League
1995 Russian Second League

4
1995
Russia
Russia